Buriabad (also Romanized as Būrīābād; also known as Bīrīābād) is a village in Pain Velayat Rural District, in the Central District of Torbat-e Heydarieh County, Razavi Khorasan Province, Iran. At the 2006 census, its population was 616, in 170 families.

References 

Populated places in Torbat-e Heydarieh County